Utricularia dichotoma, commonly known as fairy aprons, is a variable, perennial species of terrestrial bladderwort. It is a widespread species with mauve or purple fan-shaped flowers on a slender stalk and usually grows in wet locations.

Description
Utricularia dichotoma is a perennial herb with numerous underground trailing stems with bladders  in diameter. The former is more typical of plants growing in wet soil, the latter of plants growing fully submerged.

Taxonomy and naming
Utricularia dichotoma was first formally described in 1805 by Jacques Labillardière and the description was published in Novae Hollandiae Plantarum Specimen. The specific epithet (dichotoma)  is Latin for "dividing into pairs" and refers to the double arrangement of flowers which this species often displays.

Distribution and habitat 
Fairy aprons has a large range and is native to New Caledonia, it grows in all states of Australia and in New Zealand on the North Island, South Island and Stewart Island/Rakiura - this being the most southerly location at which a member of this genus occurs. It grows in moist and wet locations.

References

Carnivorous plants of the Pacific
Carnivorous plants of Australia
Carnivorous plants of New Zealand
Flora of the North Island
Flora of the South Island
dichotoma
Lamiales of Australia
Flora of Queensland
Flora of Victoria (Australia)
Flora of Tasmania
Eudicots of Western Australia
Flora of South Australia
Flora of New South Wales